In the Star Wars space opera franchise, a droid is a fictional robot possessing some degree of artificial intelligence. The term is a  clipped form of "android", a word originally reserved for robots designed to look and act like a human. The word "android" itself stems from the New Latin word "androīdēs", meaning "manlike", itself from the Ancient Greek ἀνδρος (andrós) (genitive of ἀνήρ (anḗr), "man (adult male)" or "human being") + -ειδής (-eidḗs), itself from εἶδος (eîdos, "form, image, shape, appearance, look").

Writer and director George Lucas first used the term "droid" in the second draft script of Star Wars, completed 28 January 1975. However, the word does have a precedent: science fiction writer Mari Wolf used the word in her story "Robots of the World! Arise!" in 1952. It's not known if Lucas knew of this reference when he wrote Star Wars, or if he came up with the term independently.

The word "droid" has been a registered trademark of Lucasfilm Ltd since 1977.

Behind the scenes
Droids are performed using a variety of methods, including robotics, actors inside costumes (in one case, on stilts), and computer animation.

Trademark
Lucasfilm registered "droid" as a trademark in 1977. The term "Droid" has been used by Verizon Wireless under licence from Lucasfilm, for their line of smartphones based on the Android operating system. Motorola's late-2009 Google Android-based cell phone is called the Droid. This line of phone has been expanded to include other Android-based phones released under Verizon, including the HTC Droid Eris, the HTC Droid Incredible, Motorola Droid X, Motorola Droid 2, and Motorola Droid Pro. The term was also used for the Lucasfilm projects EditDroid, a non-linear editing system, and SoundDroid, an early digital audio workstation. The name "Omnidroid" was used with permission of Lucasfilm for the 2004 Pixar movie, The Incredibles, referring to a line of lethal robots built by the film's antagonist.

Fictional types of droids
The franchise, which began with the 1977 film Star Wars, features a variety of droids designed to perform specific functions.  According to background material, most droids lack true sentience and are given processing abilities sufficient only to carry out their assigned function.  However, over time droids may develop sentience on their own as they accumulate experience.  Periodic memory wipes can prevent this from happening, but those who manage to escape this fate will begin to develop their own personalities.

Within the Star Wars universe, a class system is used to categorize different droids depending on their skill-set: first class droids (physical, mathematical and medical sciences), second class droids (engineering and technical sciences), third class droids (social sciences and service functions), fourth class droids (security and military functions), and fifth class droids (menial labor and other non-intelligence functions).

Protocol droid
A protocol droid specializes in translation, etiquette and cultural customs, and is typically humanoid in appearance.  Protocol droids are used to aid in communications during diplomatic or business negotiations and often function as personal assistants to their owners.  Protocol droids are also used for military service, whether as administrators, couriers or spies.  However, they do have a tendency to be eccentric and fussy.

The most notable example is C-3PO, introduced in Star Wars and featured in all sequels and prequels. 4-LOM is a protocol droid turned bounty hunter who responds to Darth Vader's call to capture the Millennium Falcon in The Empire Strikes Back (1980). TC-14 is a droid with feminine programming that appears in Star Wars: Episode I – The Phantom Menace (1999), and ME-8D9 is an "ancient protocol droid of unknown manufacture" that resides and works as a translator at Maz Kanata's castle on Takodana in Star Wars: The Force Awakens (2015).

Astromech droid
An astromech droid is one of a series of "versatile utility robots generally used for the maintenance and repair of starships and related technology". These small droids usually possess "a variety of tool-tipped appendages that are stowed in recessed compartments". On certain spacecraft such as X-wing starfighters, astromech droids also double as the ship's navigational system.  In addition to assisting with piloting and maintenance, astromech droids work in conjunction with the ship's hyperdrive to plot a safe course when traveling at faster-than-light speeds.

R2-D2 is an astromech droid introduced in 1977's Star Wars and featured in all subsequent films. The malfunctioning droid R5-D4 also makes a brief appearance in Star Wars. U9-C4 is a timid droid sent on a mission with D-Squad, an all-droid special unit in Star Wars: The Clone Wars, C1-10P (nicknamed "Chopper") is an oft-repaired, "outmoded" astromech who is one of the main characters of Star Wars Rebels, and BB-8 is the astromech droid of X-wing fighter pilot Poe Dameron in The Force Awakens.

Battle droid

A battle droid is a class of military robot used as an easily controlled alternative to human soldiers, most notably seen in the Star Wars prequel trilogy of films and the Star Wars: The Clone Wars TV series, in which 'B1' and 'B2' models are frequent antagonists. Due to their ubiquity, the terms 'B1' and 'battle droid' are used interchangeably; 'B2' models are also referred to as 'super' battle droids. These droids are mainly used as the primary troops of the Confederacy of Independent Systems or Separatist Alliance, acting as the counterpart to the clone troopers of the Galactic Republic during the Clone Wars.

The tall, thin B1 model resembles the Geonosian species, whose Baktoid Armor Workshop designed and built the droids for the Trade Federation and later the Separatists. During the Battle of Naboo, battle droids were controlled from a central command computer as a cost-saving measure. By the time of the Clone Wars, this drawback was rectified by giving them the capacity for limited independent thought. The B2 super battle droid, introduced in the Battle of Geonosis, was designed by the Techno Union and manufactured by Baktoid as an improvement of the original B1 model. Heavily armored and capable of limited independent thought, it features an integrated dual laser cannon in its right arm.

B1 battle droids have been criticized for being ineffective and boring opponents in the Star Wars films, easily destroyed and devoid of any personality.  However, Rafael Motamayor of SyFy Wire argues that the 2008 Star Wars: The Clone Wars television series rehabilitated their image by giving them distinct personalities.  With the in-universe explanation that battle droids were upgraded to have independent thought, battle droids in the series are shown with self-awareness of their cannon fodder nature.  This is often used as comic relief as battle droids comment on their tragic situation and even question orders that would get themselves or other battle droids killed.

Beyond the B1 and B2 models, multiple other types of specialized battle droids have been featured in the Star Wars fictional universe. The droideka is a three-legged heavy infantry unit designed by the Colicoids, a bloodthirsty insect-like species which it resembles. Commando droids are superior versions of the B1 battle droid, built sturdier with armor to withstand blaster fire and more advanced combat programming and battlefield awareness. The T-series tactical droids serve as advisors to Separatist commanders or command groups of other battle droids, while super tactical droids serve as generals of droid armies and fleets. Droid vehicles and spacecraft include Vulture droids, Dwarf spider droids and Hailfire droids. After the Clone Wars, the Imperial Senate banned the manufacture of battle droids, but with loopholes for the building of "security" droids and experimental combat droids. This includes the Imperial military's KX-series of which K-2SO is an example, as well as Moff Gideon's pure-droid heavy-duty Dark Troopers.

Probe droid

Probe droids are deployed by the Empire in The Empire Strikes Back to search for hidden rebel bases. They are described as traveling via hyperdrive-equipped pods to almost anywhere in the galaxy in order to search for their target. Probots are equipped with a variety of sensing equipment, including motion detectors and ultraviolet sensors, a blaster for self-defense, and a HoloNet transceiver to transmit any discoveries to Imperial forces.

During the production of The Empire Strikes Back, Joe Johnston drew storyboard panels influenced by Dan O'Bannon and Moebius's short comic "The Long Tomorrow" (1975), one of which repurposes a pose Johnston admitted he borrowed from said work. The same panel of the comic features a robot design by Moebius, which may have been the basis of the probe droid (or "probot") design that concept designers Johnston and Ralph McQuarrie created for the film.

Other droids
Labor droids are used for a variety of tasks, from the very simple such as lifting heavy objects to the complex such as repairing machinery or administrating entire facilities, though their programming is very task-specific.  Examples include mining droids which extract valuable resources, often from hazardous environments, and power droids, mobile fusion reactors which recharge ships, machines and other droids.  Interrogation droids utilize a variety of devices, chemicals and techniques to exploit a prisoner's weaknesses in order to extract information from them.  Assassin droids such as the IG-series act with ruthless efficiency to hunt down their targets; while some serve other masters, others may operate independently.  Medical droids on the other hand work tirelessly to heal people who have been harmed, whether as medical assistants, midwives or doctors.  Many possess an encyclopedic knowledge of different species' physiologies so that patients can be properly diagnosed and treated.

List of droid characters

References

External links 
 
 
 

Fictional extraterrestrial robots
Film characters introduced in 1977